The Succinivibrionaceae are Gram-negative bacteria and belong to the Gammaproteobacteria. They are rod-shaped and obligate anaerobes.

References

External links
 Succinivibrionaceae LPSN

Aeromonadales